Smyrna is an unincorporated community in Cass County, Texas, United States, about  from Atlanta on Highway 77. It was established in 1880. Smyrna had a population of 215 as of 2000.

References

Unincorporated communities in Cass County, Texas
Unincorporated communities in Texas